Sneha Sharma (born 1 August 1990) is an Indian racing driver who competes in Formula 4 National Racing Championship, she is also professionally a Pilot with Vistara Airlines (since 2022). Sneha was born in Kolkata however, since childhood she has been raised in Mumbai, she did her education from the Canossa Convent School in Andheri, Mumbai and flying training from San Francisco, Miami in USA and Kuala Lumpur in Malaysia.

Racing career
She has been racing since the age of 16. At the age of 17 she raced in the MRF National karting championship while pursuing her high school and flying studies. In 2010 she graduated to cars from karts and has also competed in the JK Tyre National racing Championship. Sneha secured a second position in her 4-stroke category at the JK Tyre National Karting Championship 2009 and was also the only girl to qualify for the final round of the KCT of the MAI National Karting Championship. She was shortlisted for the 2015 Volkswagen Vento Cup and The Toyota Etios Cup in India. Sneha Sharma was given the title of India's fastest female Racer after securing top 5 position in the Mercedes young star driver program. Because of not having a sponsor or a strong economic background, the teachers who taught her about basics of braking and cornering were simple mechanics and Sneha has performed various jobs at the race track to subsidise her racing fee. As of today Sneha receives sponsorship for her racing career from JK tyres and Indigo airlines. She has also been offered racing seats in Germany and Malaysia. Currently, in various categories, Sneha has won over all, 6 race victories and 14 runner up positions

In 2019, Sharma attempted to qualify for a W Series, but failed to progress beyond the evaluation day.

Racing record

Career summary

References

 
 
 
 
 
 

1990 births
Living people
Indian racing drivers
Formula 4 drivers
Female racing drivers
Team Meritus drivers